The current Cabinet of Japan (Second Kishida Cabinet (reshuffled)) has 18 male officers including Prime Minister Fumio Kishida and 2 female officers, Sanae Takaichi and Keiko Nagaoka.

 denotes the first female minister of that particular department.

See also
Cabinet
Cabinet of Japan
Politics of Japan

External links
 List of female cabinet ministers of Japan

Ministers
Ministers

Japan
Ministers
Cabinet ministers